Celadrin is an over-the-counter medication marketed as a topical analgesic. It is a cream that is used for muscle and joint pains including osteoarthritis, strains, bruises, and sprains. The active ingredient is menthol and it also contains cetylated and esterified fatty acids.

Research

A before/after human study with no placebo control showed that one week of treatment with Celadrin was effective at reducing pain and improving functional performance in individuals with arthritis of the knee, elbow, and wrist.

References 

Analgesics